Dobashi is a Hiroden station on the Hiroden Main Line and Hiroden Eba Line, located in Sakai-machi, Naka-ku, Hiroshima. It is operated by the Hiroshima Electric Railway.

Routes
There are five routes that serve Dobashi Station:
 Hiroshima Station - Hiroden-miyajima-guchi Route
 Hiroden-nishi-hiroshima - Hiroshima Port Route
 Hiroshima Station - Eba Route
 Yokogawa Station - Eba Route
 Hakushima - Eba Route

Station layout
The station consists of two side platforms serving two tracks. Access to the platforms is via a crosswalk. South of the station, the Main Line turns right, while the Eba Line separates from the Main Line and continues straight.

Adjacent stations

Surrounding area
Chugoku Shimbun head office
Hiroshima Peace Memorial Park
Musubi-Musashi Dobashi

History
Opened on December 8, 1912.

See also

Hiroden Streetcar Lines and Routes

Hiroden Eba Line stations
Hiroden Main Line stations
Railway stations in Japan opened in 1912